Bolivian Americans or Bolivia-Americans (or ) are Americans of at least partial Bolivian descent. In Bolivia sometimes referred to colloquially as “gringo bolivianos” or “yanqui llocallas”.

Bolivian Americans are usually those of Indigenous, Mestizo, or Spanish background but also occasionally having African, German, Croatian, Lebanese and/or Japanese heritage.

Bolivians compose the third smallest Latin American group in the United States, with a 2010 Census population of 99,210.  The highest concentration resides in the Washington D.C. Metropolitan Area, which accounts for 38% of the total Bolivian population in the United States (especially Fairfax County, VA).  Additional areas of concentration include the New York City borough of Queens, Miami-Dade County, and the cities of Los Angeles and Providence, Rhode Island.

History 

Bolivian immigration into the United States occurred in two significant phases.  The first phase occurred during and subsequent to the 1952 National Revolution (between 1952 and the latter 1960s). Most of these immigrants consisted of middle- to upper-middle income occupational professionals or political dissidents, belonging mainly to Bolivia's European descendant community.

The second notable phase of Bolivian immigration (between 1980 and 1988) was a result of Bolivia's fiscal policies in the 1970s which gave way to the hyperinflation throughout most of the 1980s. Most of these immigrants consisted of lower-income Mestizo (European/Amerindian mix) and Indigenous Bolivians obtaining work posts as service and manual laborers. Most of the Bolivian American population is of Quechua descent, with the majority of them hailing from the Valle Alto region of Cochabamba, from towns like Tarata, Arbieto, Cliza, Punata, and Tolata, with most of them living in the D.C. area.

Many Bolivians who emigrated to the United States came as tourists. However, many remained of indefinite way in the country, setting with family and friends. This made it difficult to know the number of Bolivians living in the United States. Between 1984 and 1993, only 4,574 Bolivians got U.S. citizenship. In this period about 457 were naturalized each year.

Demographics 

Bolivians have settled throughout the United States, mainly in Washington D.C., California and Maryland; there are also large groups of Bolivian immigrants in Texas, New York City, New Jersey, South Florida, North Carolina, Rhode Island, Massachusetts, and Chicago, home to a community of Bolivian medical doctors and their families, most of whom originally from Cochabamba. The number of Bolivians in the U.S. in 2006 was estimated at 82,322. Most Bolivian immigrants are high school or college graduates; many work in companies or in government.

Areas 

The largest populations of Bolivians are situated in the following areas (Source: Census 2010):

 Washington-Arlington-Alexandria, DC-VA-MD-WV MSA – 37,607
 New York-Northern New Jersey-Long Island, NY-NJ-PA MSA – 9,749
 Los Angeles-Long Beach-Santa Ana, CA MSA – 7,068
 Miami-Fort Lauderdale-Pompano Beach, FL MSA – 6,697
 Houston-Sugar Land-Baytown, TX MSA – 2,359
 Chicago-Joliet-Naperville, IL-IN-WI MSA – 2,099
 San Francisco-Oakland-Fremont, CA MSA – 2,078
 Providence-New Bedford-Fall River, RI-MA MSA – 1,970
 Dallas-Fort Worth-Arlington, TX MSA – 1,223
 Boston-Cambridge-Quincy, MA-NH MSA – 1,170
 Riverside-San Bernardino-Ontario, CA MSA – 1,114
 San Jose-Sunnyvale-Santa Clara, CA MSA – 898
 San Diego-Carlsbad-San Marcos, CA MSA and Tampa-St. Petersburg-Clearwater, FL MSA – 808
 Orlando-Kissimmee-Sanford, FL MSA – 744
 Baltimore-Towson, MD MSA – 710
 Atlanta-Sandy Springs-Marietta, GA MSA – 647
 Seattle-Tacoma-Bellevue, WA MSA – 558
 Philadelphia-Camden-Wilmington, PA-NJ-DE-MD MSA – 524
 Salt Lake City, UT MSA – 519
 Phoenix-Mesa-Glendale, AZ MSA – 502

Immigrants by County 2015-2019

Total immigrant population from Bolivia in the U.S.: 78,900

Top Counties:

1) Fairfax County, VA ---------------------------- 13,000

2) Miami-Dade County, FL --------------------- 4,000

3) Los Angeles County, CA -------------------- 3,600

4) Arlington County, VA -------------------------- 3,600

5) Montgomery County, MD ------------------- 3,500

6) Prince William County, VA ------------------ 3,300

7) Queens Borough, NY -------------------------- 1,800

8) Orange County, CA ----------------------------- 1,800

9) Loudoun County, VA --------------------------- 1,800

10) Providence County, RI ---------------------- 1,700

11) Harris County, TX ----------------------------- 1,600

12) Collier County, FL ----------------------------- 1,500

13) Broward County, FL -------------------------- 1,400

14) Alexandria City, VA --------------------------- 1,300

15) Cook County, IL -------------------------------- 1,100

Notable people

 Juan Fernando Bastos – Bolivian born, American portrait artist
 Javier Calderon - Bolivian born, classical guitarist and University professor
 F. Xavier Castellanos - pediatric neuroscientist and medical doctor (Born Spain of Bolivian parents)
 Marcelo Claure – CEO of SoftBank Group, and Brightstar Corporation (Born Brazil of Bolivian parents)
 Liliana Colanzi — Professor of comparative literature, fiction writer known for environmentalist science fiction
 Windsor del Llano – soccer player
 Jaime Escalante – educator
 Marco Etcheverry – soccer player, U.S. Soccer Hall of Fame
 Pato Hoffmann - movie and TV actor, advocate for American Indians
 Markita del Carpio Landry - chemical engineer, university professor, researcher on nano materials for brain imaging and agriculture (Bolivian mother, French-Canadian father)
 Jaime Laredo – Grammy Award winning musician, violinist, conductor
 Jaime Moreno – soccer player, U.S. Soccer Hall of Fame
 Jaime Mendoza-Nava – composer of Hollywood sound tracks and symphony conductor
 Ben Mikaelsen – writer of children's literature
 Mohammed Mostajo-Radji - Bolivian born, neuroscientist, science educator, diplomat
 Cecilia Muñoz – public servant
 Milenka Peña – journalist, TV personality
 Josh Reaves – professional basketball player for Dallas Mavericks of the NBA (mother Bolivian)
 Vicente Sarmiento - economist, lawyer, politician
 Carlos Scott – retired Bolivian-American soccer midfielder
 James T. Slater – singer/songwriter
 Leo Spitzer - college professor, historian, author
 Chris Syler – singer/songwriter
 Alberto Torrico – member of the California Unemployment Insurance Appeals Board
 Raquel Welch – actress, author (father Bolivian)

See also

Fraternidad cultural pachamama
Bolivia–United States relations
American Bolivian Collective

References

Further reading
 Eigo, Tim. "Bolivian Americans." Gale Encyclopedia of Multicultural America, edited by Thomas Riggs, (3rd ed., vol. 1, Gale, 2014), pp. 319–329. online
 Paz-Soldan, Edmundo. “Obsessive Signs of Identity: Bolivians in the United States.” In The Other Latinos, ed. José Luis Falconi and José Antonio Mazzoti. (Rockefeller Center for Latin American Studies at Harvard, 2008).
 Vargas Caro, Michaela. "5 Bolivian American Creatives You Need to Know." REMEZCLA Media Company, edited by Stephany Torres online
 Eckels, Charlene and Aliaga, Anneli. "EXPLORING CULTURAL IDENTITIES / EXPLORANDO IDENTIDADES CULTURALES " Bolivian Express Media,
 Vargas Caro, Michaela. "‘Functional & Beautiful’ Lips Bolivianita Gloss" REMEZCLA Media Company, edited by Stephany Torres online
 Cavero, Raleigh, "Our Latino Heritage: Why Chicago Became Home to Many Bolivian Doctors" NBC News Latino Reports  |url=http://www.nbcnews.com/news/latino/our-latino-heritage-why-chicago-became-home-many-bolivian-doctors-n554886

 
 
Hispanic and Latino American
Hispanic and Latino American history